Huguette Bouchardeau (born 1 June 1935) is a French socialist politician, as well as a publisher (founder of HB Éditions), essayist, and biographer.

Political career
Bouchardeau was a candidate of the Unified Socialist Party (PSU) in the 1981 presidential election, receiving 1.1% of the vote, and National Secretary of the Party between 1979 and 1981. Bouchardeau also served as Minister of the Environment and Way of Life in the French Socialist Party-led cabinets of Pierre Mauroy (1981–1984) and Laurent Fabius (1984–1986).

Selected works
 La famille Renoir, 2004
 La grande verrière, 1991
Le déjeuner, 1998
Le ministère du possible, 1986
Les roches rouges: Portrait d'un père, 1997
Leur père notre père, 1996
Mes nuits avec Descartes, 2002
Nathalie Sarraute, 2003
Pas d'histoire, les femmes, 1977
Rose Noël, 1992
Simone Weil, 1995
Tout le possible, 1981
, 1975
Un coin dans leur monde,1980

References

1935 births
Living people
People from Saint-Étienne
Candidates in the 1981 French presidential election
Politicians from Auvergne-Rhône-Alpes
Unified Socialist Party (France) politicians
French socialist feminists
French Ministers of the Environment
Deputies of the 8th National Assembly of the French Fifth Republic
Deputies of the 9th National Assembly of the French Fifth Republic
Women government ministers of France
French biographers
French essayists
Officiers of the Légion d'honneur
20th-century French women